On Tour is a 1990 Italian comedy-drama film directed by Gabriele Salvatores. It was screened in the Un Certain Regard section at the 1990 Cannes Film Festival. It is the second installment of Salvatores' "escape trilogy", after Marrakech Express; like its predecessor, it is a road movie, and features Diego Abatantuono playing the protagonist.

Plot
Two thirty-five-year-old actors, Dario and Federico, friends since school, set off on a "tour" from Apulia to Emilia Romagna to play "The Cherry Orchard" by Anton Chekhov. Extroverted and with precise cinematographic ambitions, Dario tries to encourage the introverted Federico, now depressed because neglected by Vittoria, a radio announcer. She, unbeknownst to Federico, is romantically linked with Dario, to whom she gave the unpleasant task of informing his friend. Concerned by the state of prostration of Federico, who continually messes up theatrical performances, Dario hides the truth from him. Disappointed by this situation, Vittoria, after having reached them, confesses that she loves both, who seem to complement each other. Disconcerted by the behavior of the woman and a failed project of a film, Dario and Federico decide to give up the woman who has set them against each other and, unexpectedly, abandon by mutual agreement the precarious profession of actor going, still friends, to the fortune.

Cast
 Diego Abatantuono as Dario Nigri
 Fabrizio Bentivoglio as Federico Lolli
 Laura Morante as Vittoria
 Luigi Montini as Leonardo Pavia (credited as Gigi Montini)
 Barbara Scoppa as Olimpia
 Ugo Conti as Attilio
 Eva Vanicek as Ida Florio
 Leonardo Gajo as Mattia
 Giovanni Bosich as Gobetti
 Isabella Perricone as Margherita
 Nini Salerno as Peruzzi
 Claudio Bisio as Tank station man
 Piero Vivarelli as The American

References

External links

1990 films
1990s road comedy-drama films
1990s Italian-language films
Italian road comedy-drama films
Films about actors
Films directed by Gabriele Salvatores
1990s Italian films